Since the inception of the Serie A, Italy's highest level of association football annual league tournament, 84 football stadiums have been used to host matches. The inaugural round of Serie A matches took place on 6 October 1929 with 18 clubs hosting the opening fixtures.

Stadiums
Stadiums listed in bold indicate that they are the home grounds of teams participating in the 2022–23 Serie A season, while those stadiums listed in italics have now been demolished. Clubs in parenthesis no longer share the stadium.

References